Route 1A is a north–south state highway in Massachusetts. It is an alternate route to U.S. 1 with three signed sections and two unsigned sections where the highway is concurrent with its parent. Due to the reconfiguration of tunnel interchanges brought on by the completion of the Big Dig, Route 1A is discontinuous in the downtown Boston area. Vehicles entering Downtown Boston via the Sumner Tunnel must take I-93 north to the exit for Government Center and make a U-turn to access the entrance ramp to I-93 south (which silently carries Route 1A south as well) and vice versa.

Route description

Rhode Island border to Attleboro
A short segment of Route 1A,  in length, in Attleboro runs from U.S. Route 1A at the Rhode Island border through a junction with Interstate 95, before heading north and merging with Route 1.  The entire length of this segment is known as Newport Avenue.

North Attleborough to Dedham
This segment of Route 1A extends roughly north from North Attleborough to Dedham, passing through the towns of Plainville, Wrentham, Norfolk, Walpole, Norwood and Westwood on the way.  Prior to its realignment along I-95 and I-93, Route 1 continued north along the Providence Highway towards Boston at the junction of Route 1A and that road.

Boston to Salisbury

This segment of Route 1A extends from Boston, Massachusetts to Salisbury, Massachusetts.

The highway starts from US 1 (which is on the Central Artery with I-93 and Route 3) at the former Government Center/Logan Airport interchange. It passes through the Callahan Tunnel (outbound/northbound) and Sumner Tunnel (inbound/southbound), becoming the East Boston Expressway past Logan Airport.  The East Boston Expressway was the first freeway built in the city. Immediately beyond Logan Airport, Interstate 90 ends at Route 1A.

The road continues as a divided highway through Revere.  It is a limited access highway through Revere, passing Suffolk Downs and the Wonderland Greyhound Park (which is across the street from the outer terminus of the MBTA's Blue Line), before running through the isolated Point of Pines neighborhood and exiting Revere over the General Edwards Bridge into Lynn.  For the first mile and a half in Lynn, it is concurrent with the Lynnway, and is a high-traffic retail area. After the Lynnway portion, the route becomes concurrent with Route 129 for a mile, before crossing into Swampscott as Paradise Road.  At Vinnin Square, it passes into Salem as Loring Avenue, passing by Salem State University. The route turns left onto Lafayette Street and is concurrent with Route 114. At the intersection with Derby Street, notable for the large fire station, the route turns right. At the next stop sign, the route turns left onto Hawthorne Boulevard passing Salem Common and the Salem Witch Museum before turning left onto Winter Street. At the end of Winter Street, the route turns right onto Bridge Street crossing the Veterans Memorial Bridge into Beverly.  It follows two of the main streets of downtown Beverly, before heading north, passing through Wenham and Hamilton (through this section the road is occasionally signed as a US Route) before becoming the main road through the town of Ipswich, crossing the historic Choate Bridge over the Ipswich River.  While in Ipswich, much of the route runs concurrently with Route 133 until just over the town line into Rowley.  It passes through the main village of Rowley, as well as the central villages of Newbury.  In Newburyport, Massachusetts, it merges with Route 1, signed with its parent highway over the Merrimack River and into the town center of Salisbury. It then heads east from the Salisbury town center before turning north and ending in Salisbury Beach at the New Hampshire border.  New Hampshire Route 1A continues north from this point.

History
Initially, Route 1A ran along part of its present-day route between the New Hampshire state line and Revere. It then turned west along present-day Route 16 until it ended at US 1 (now Route 99) in Everett. Then, in 1931, an interchange in Revere was built over Route 107 (Broadway). In 1933, another, disconnected portion of Route 1A appeared between Attleboro and the Rhode Island state line. In 1934, two changes were made to the route. In Revere, the route was realigned to turn west smoothly. Between Boston and North Attleborough, a huge portion of Route 11 and all of Route 150 were replaced by Route 1A. The new portion soon got truncated to Dedham in 1936.
It then got truncated even further to end at US 1/Route 128.

Later history
After Route C1 was decommissioned in 1971 in favor of a new alignment of US 1, Route 1A was truncated to a roundabout interchange in Revere. As a result, Route 16 extended eastward along the then-former route. After all unbuilt Boston freeways were cancelled by 1973, US 1 was rerouted onto the Northeast Expressway (formerly proposed I-95). As a result of that, Route 1A was extended south towards the Sumner/Callahan Tunnels and then north along Central Artery towards US 1 (Storrow Drive). In 1989, US 1 was rerouted from Storrow Drive onto I-93's Southeast Expressway, causing "signed" Route 1A to get truncated.

Major intersections

References

External links

Massachusetts Executive Office of Transportation - Boston's First Expressway
 East Boston Expressway - Historic Overview

001A
A Massachusetts
North Attleborough, Massachusetts
Plainville, Massachusetts
Historic trails and roads in Dedham, Massachusetts